Ehi or EHI may refer to:

 Ehi (biblical figure), a minor Old Testament figure
 Ehi (spirit), the name of a personal spirit in some West African religious beliefs
 Endurmenntun Háskóla Íslands, a continuing education centre operated by the University of Iceland
 Energy Helicity Index
 Ihy, an ancient Egyptian child god